Jongmin Park (born 1986) is a South Korean opera singer who has sung leading bass roles in the opera houses of Germany, Austria, and the United Kingdom. Born in Seoul, he was the winner of the Song Prize at the 2015 BBC Cardiff Singer of the World competition Park also won First Prize (male singer) at the 2011 Tchaikovsky Competition and the Birgit Nilsson Prize for the German Repertoire of Richard Strauss and Richard Wagner at the 2011 Operalia Competition.

Park studied singing at the Korea National University of Arts and then at the Accademia del Teatro alla Scala in Milan before becoming a member of the Hamburg State Opera from 2010 to 2013. He made his Royal Opera House debut in 2014 as Colline in La bohème and sang at the Vienna State Opera in the 2013/2014 season where his roles included Zuniga in Carmen, Don Basilio in Le nozze di Figaro, and Colline.

References

External links
BBC Cardiff Singer of the World, Profile: Jongmin Park
Park's schedule on Operabase

Living people
Operatic basses
South Korean opera singers
1986 births
21st-century South Korean male singers
South Korean basses
Korea National University of Arts alumni